The 1997 European Figure Skating Championships was a senior-level international competition held in Paris, France. Elite skaters from European ISU member nations competed in the disciplines of men's singles, ladies' singles, pair skating, and ice dancing.

Results

Men

Ladies

Pairs

Ice dancing

References

External links
 1997 European Figure Skating Championships

European Figure Skating Championships, 1997
European Figure Skating Championships
International figure skating competitions hosted by France
European Figure Skating Championships, 1997
International sports competitions hosted by Paris
European Figure Skating Championships
European Figure Skating Championships